Major John Patten (April 26, 1746 – December 26, 1800) was a United States farmer and politician from Dover, in Kent County, Delaware. He was an officer of the Continental Army in the American Revolution, a Continental Congressman, and a member of the Democratic-Republican Party, who served in the Delaware General Assembly and as a United States representative from Delaware.

Early life and family
Patten was born at Tyn Head Court near Dover in the Delaware Colony, son of John Patten and Ann Maxwell. This property is near Dover Air Force Base, near the farms of Caesar Rodney and John Dickinson. He was a farmer, who after the American Revolution married Ann Haslet, daughter of the first Colonel of the 1st Delaware Regiment, John Haslet. She died soon thereafter, and he married Mary Miller Loockerman, daughter of the Rev. John Miller and widow of Vincent Loockerman.

American Revolution
Patten was commissioned a first lieutenant in Captain John Caldwell's 2nd Company of the 1st Delaware Regiment at the beginning of the American Revolutionary War. He was soon promoted to captain of the 1st Company and in February 1779 and was promoted to the rank of major. He fought in every major battle from the Battle of Long Island until the Battle of Camden, where the Delaware Regiment suffered grievous losses, and he was taken prisoner. Paroled in 1781, after the fighting was over, he is said to have walked home alone in rags from Charleston, South Carolina.

Political career
Patten was elected in 1785 to the State House or House of Assembly, as it was then known, and represented Kent County, during the 1785/86 session. At the same time he was elected to the Continental Congress in 1785 and served there one year. He won a closely contested election to the U.S. House in 1792 and took his seat in the U.S. House on March 4, 1793. However, Henry Latimer, the Federal candidate contested the election, claiming that many ballots were invalid because they were filled out incorrectly. After a lengthy study the Federalist majority in the U.S. House voted on February 14, 1794 to invalidate enough ballots to award the seat to Latimer. A few months later Patten again defeated Latimer, and this time served the whole term, from March 4, 1795 until March 3, 1797. Brought out of political retirement in 1800, Patten was defeated for the U.S. House seat by the incumbent Federalist James A. Bayard.

Death and legacy
Patten died at his home, Tynhead Court, near Dover, and is buried in the Old Presbyterian Cemetery, which is at Dover, on the grounds of the Delaware State Museum. He had a home on the north side of Front Street, between Orange and Tatnall Streets in Wilmington, Delaware, but was always a legal resident of Kent County. He was active in the Philadelphia Society for promoting Agriculture, the Society of the Cincinnati, and the Lyceum of Delaware.

Almanac
Elections were held October 1. Members of the General Assembly took office on October 20 or the following weekday. The State Assemblymen were elected for a one-year term. They chose the Continental Congressmen for a one-year term. U.S. Representatives took office March 4 and have a two-year term.

After 1792 elections were moved to the first Tuesday of October and members of the General Assembly took office on the first Tuesday of January. The State Legislative Council was renamed the State Senate and the State House of Assembly was renamed the State House of Representatives.

Notes

References

Images
 Portrait courtesy of the Delaware Public Archives.

External links
Biographical Dictionary of the U.S. Congress
Delaware's Members of Congress

The Political Graveyard
Society of the Cincinnati
A merican Revolution Institute

Places with more information
Delaware Historical Society; website; 505 North Market Street, Wilmington, Delaware 19801; (302) 655-7161
University of Delaware; Library website; 181 South College Avenue, Newark, Delaware 19717; (302) 831-2965
Historical Society of Pennsylvania website 1300 Locust St. Philadelphia, Pennsylvania (215) 732-6200.

1746 births
1800 deaths
American Presbyterians
People from Dover, Delaware
Farmers from Delaware
Continental Army officers from Delaware
American Revolutionary War prisoners of war held by Great Britain
Members of the Delaware House of Representatives
Continental Congressmen from Delaware
18th-century American politicians
Burials in Dover, Delaware
Democratic-Republican Party members of the United States House of Representatives from Delaware
People of colonial Delaware
Members of the United States House of Representatives removed by contest